The Ann Arbor Railroad  is a Class III Railroad that operates fifty miles of track from Toledo, Ohio, to Osmer, Michigan. The railroad is operated by Watco and is based out of Toledo. Prior to Watco, the railroad was operated by the Ann Arbor Acquisition Corporation from 1988 to 2013, by the Michigan Interstate Railway from 1977 to 1988, and as a privately owned enterprise prior to 1977.

Current Operations
The Ann Arbor Railroad operates  of track between its main terminal, Ottawa Yard, in Toledo, Ohio, and Ann Arbor, Michigan, the interchange point with the Great Lakes Central Railroad and Norfolk Southern. A branch line known as the Saline Branch stretches four miles from Pittsfield, Michigan, to Saline, Michigan. The Saline Branch has been used in the past to serve the Faurecia Automotive Components Plant located in Saline, Michigan, but is not currently being used in revenue service.  The Ann Arbor Railroad also leases and operates an industrial lead in Toledo owned by the Norfolk Southern. Much of what the railroad transports is "bridge traffic" and is received at either end of the railroad and transported for interchange with another railroad at the opposite terminal. A variety of different cargoes are transported ranging from grain to liquefied petroleum gas to wooden poles.  In Toledo, the railroad serves Chrysler transporting finished vehicles from the Toledo Complex.

Hallett Tower, the only remaining operational interlocking tower in Ohio, ceased operation in September 2019 with all dispatching duties being shifted to the dispatch center in Pittsburg, Kansas. While the tower itself is still standing, it is now being utilized by the signal dept.

Historical Operations
For 1895 to 1977, see Ann Arbor Railroad (1895–1976)
For 1977 to 1988, see Michigan Interstate Railway

Current roster

Interchanges
Toledo, Ohio:
Norfolk Southern
CSX
Canadian National
Wheeling & Lake Erie Railway
Osmer, Michigan:
Great Lakes Central Railroad
Milan, Michigan:
Norfolk Southern
Diann, Michigan:
Canadian National
Indiana & Ohio Railway

External links
Ann Arbor Railroad Technical and Historical Society
Various General Information

Michigan railroads
Ohio railroads
Railway companies established in 1988
Transportation in Livingston County, Michigan
Transportation in Monroe County, Michigan
Transportation in Benzie County, Michigan
Transportation in Toledo, Ohio
Transportation in Ann Arbor, Michigan
Watco